Space Camp is an educational camp in Huntsville, Alabama, on the grounds of the U.S. Space & Rocket Center museum near NASA's Marshall Space Flight Center. It provides residential and educational programs for children and adults on themes such as space exploration, aviation and robotics. The camp is run by a state government agency, the Alabama Space Science Exhibit Commission. More than 900,000 campers have graduated since 1982, including several who became astronauts.

History 
Space Camp was founded in 1982 as an educational camp using the United States space program as a basis to promote math and science to children. The idea was the result of a comment by rocket scientist Wernher von Braun who was touring the U.S. Space & Rocket Center in 1977 when he noticed a group of schoolchildren studying rockets and said to the museum director, "You know, we have all these camps for youngsters in this country - band camps and cheerleader camps and football camps. Why don't we have a science camp?"

U.S. Space & Rocket Center Education Foundation 
The U.S. Space & Rocket Center and Space Camp (formerly U.S. Space Camp) in Huntsville are operated by the Alabama Space Science Exhibit Commission, which is a state agency whose members are appointed by the Governor of Alabama.

The non-profit U.S. Space & Rocket Center Foundation is a separate entity and members of its board are not appointed by the governor. It is responsible for scholarship fund-raising and the licensing of camps outside the United States. There are a number of internationally licensed Space Camps, including Space Camp Turkey, Space Camp Canada (known as "Camp Spatial" in French), and Space Camp Belgium.

Space Camp Florida 
Space Camp Florida opened in 1988 and shared facilities with the Astronaut Hall of Fame in Titusville, Florida, both of which were operated by the now defunct U.S. Space Camp Foundation. The Space Camp facility closed in 2002, due to low attendance leading to financial difficulties. About 50,000 children attended the camp during its run, but in its final year as few as 14 participants filled 276 slots.  The Astronaut Hall of Fame was sold to Delaware North and remained open until 2015 as an added attraction to the Kennedy Space Center Visitor Complex with several simulators previously used by the camp available to all visitors. , the building was being used by Lockheed Martin to support work on the NASA Orion crew capsule.

Space Camp California 
Space Camp California was operated by the now defunct U.S. Space Camp Foundation at Mountain View, California from 1996 to 2002, when it closed due to financial difficulties.

Space Camp Hall of Fame 
The Space Camp Hall of Fame began in 2007 during the 25th-anniversary celebrations. According to the website, the hall was "designed to honor graduates, former employees and supporters who have distinguished themselves in their respective careers or made considerable in-kind contributions in an effort to help further the goals of the Space Camp program."

Programs 
Program names are used to define the age or focus group for which the specific program targets, with Space Camp referring to both a camp program and the parent organization.  The camp offers programs for various ages and durations of visit.  The majority of attendees visit during the summer, though spring and fall often see many school group visits, parent and child bonding camps, and adult or corporate programs.

Space Camp is a six-day program offered for children between 9 and 11 years old.  The curriculum is designed to balance education and entertainment.  Children enrolling in Space Camp can choose from one of three "tracks" of activities and study: space, aviation and robotics. Space Camp was the first of the camp programs offered, and is used as the umbrella organization name.

Space Academy is a program intended for ages 12–14, offered in six-day sessions.

Advanced Space Academy is designed for 15- to 18-year-olds. The program was originally known as Space Academy Level II and was started in Fall of 1987.  In 1987 the Space Academy Level II program was college accredited (1 hour) through the University of Alabama Huntsville.  It also offered programs for adults as the first class to go through Level II were adults.  The Family Camp program allows parents or guardians to attend Space Camp with their child aged 7–12 years.  The program is run throughout the year, lasts three to four days, and includes activities in which the adult and child work together. Family Camp also has an Aviation Challenge option, designed for children and their accompanying adult, offered during the summer months.

Advanced Space Academy Elite is offered to graduates of the Advanced Space Academy program and has several exclusive features, such as scuba diving. Additionally, Space Camp has previously offered a twelve day Advanced Space Academy program that includes features such as multiple missions, scuba diving, use of some of the Aviation Challenge facilities, and a twenty four hour extended duration mission.

Scholarships 
Space Camp offers scholarships for children who have disabilities, academic talent, leadership skills, or financial needs or other disadvantages.

SCI-VIS 
In cooperation with teachers of visually impaired students, Space Camp operates a week-long Space Camp for Interested Visually Impaired Students by providing the same experience to visually impaired students as sighted students.  Adaptations are made to the computer systems campers use in activities and simulations to provide speech and large print output.  Adapted materials, including handbooks translated in Braille, and equipment are used during the camp.

Deaf Space Camp 
In cooperation with teachers, Space Camp operates a week-long  program for deaf and hard of hearing students by providing the same experience to hearing-impaired students as hearing students.  Communication is supported by a dedicated team of American Sign Language interpreters as well as through visual and written media.  To allow equal access to the audio of films, most museum & camp movies have open or closed captions; the theater provides a rear-window captioning system.  To  augment or replace microphone/headset technology, students use live stream video between mission control and the shuttle simulator.

In addition to participating in typical camp activities and simulations, students often have the opportunity to meet and interact with deaf adults who work in science-related fields and learn about the many contributions deaf individuals  such as Annie Jump Cannon (astronomer), Tsiolkovsky (considered of a "father of Rocketry"), and Dr. Thomas Wheeler (deaf NASA aerospace engineer) have made to astronomy, space exploration and science education.

Other programs 
Other programs include corporate programs, programs for adults and educators and educational field-trip programs for school groups, and the X-Camp outdoor leadership camp.  There were also special alumni sessions during the summer of the 25th anniversary.

Occasionally themed camps have been offered, usually in conjunction with museum exhibits.  During the summer of 2010 a Jedi Experience camp was offered in connection with the museum traveling exhibit Star Wars: Where Science Meets Imagination.

U.S. Cyber Camp  announced in 2017, focuses on Cyber Security.

Aviation Challenge 
Aviation Challenge, or AC, is an umbrella branding for a set of aviation oriented camps at Space Camp, consisting of three main programs for children from ages 9–18.  As an aviation oriented camp the fundamental teaching aids are computer based flight simulators, which are intended to train attendees to fly, act, and think like United States Air Force, Navy or Marine fighter pilots.

Facilities

Simulators 
There are simulators at Space Camp, such as:

The MAT (Multi-axis trainer) simulates disorientation, similar to the Multiple Axis Space Test Inertia Facility (MASTIF) developed for Project Mercury
The 1/6 Chair simulates walking on the Moon
The 5DF Chair simulates the frictionless environment of space in five degrees of freedom
The MMU (Manned Maneuvering Unit) simulates working untethered in a frictionless environment, such as during Extravehicular Activity (also known as an EVA or spacewalk).

Space Camp additionally uses rides or attractions that are on site at the U.S. Space and Rocket Center as instructional tools.  While these are not true simulators, the use of these rides is designed to allow the rider to better understand some aspect of space travel. The Space Shot simulates liftoff, and the G-Force Accelerator simulates the G-forces put on astronauts while re-entering the Earth's atmosphere or during launch.

The Intuitive Planetarium provides a venue for presenting space- and science-oriented shows produced through a Digistar 7 system and 5 Christie laser projectors. The planetarium is part of the Center's museum complex. In February 2019, the Intuitive Planetarium replaced the Spacedome IMAX theater, which operated at the Center since 1982.

Accommodation 

If a Space Camp program takes more than one day, campers stay at the space camp's Habitat 1 or Habitat 2. Habitat 1 is a large building designed to house young people. It is staffed and has full CCTV. Male and female campers are usually assigned to separate floors.

Aviation Challenge trainees stay in Habitat 3 where they are required to maintain military standards to their bays and racks. There are two floors to Hab 3. Males live on half of the ground floor and all of the second floor. Female trainees stay on the other half of the first floor. The bays are named after famous aircraft carriers. The camp has a cafeteria where campers receive meals.

Notable attendees and visitors

Attendees

Astronauts and cosmonauts:
Samantha Cristoforetti in 1995 aged 18, while a foreign exchange student.
Robert Hines in 1989 aged 14. 
Aleksandr Lazutkin attended Space Academy for Educators
Sandra Magnus attended a weekend Adult Space Academy in 1991 while a student at Georgia Tech.
Dorothy Metcalf-Lindenburger aged 14.
Jasmin Moghbeli attended Advanced Space Academy in 1998 aged 15.
Beth Moses attended Adult Space Academy in 1989.
Kathleen Rubins dreamed of becoming an astronaut as a child and did chores around the house to earn her trip to Space Camp in seventh grade.
Aleksandr Serebrov attended Space Academy for Educators in 1999, more than four years after his retirement.
Alyssa Carson, space enthusiast who has attended all of the Space Camps, first attended Huntsville in 2008
Chelsea Clinton, daughter of then President Bill Clinton, attended the International Space Camp in 1993.
Karenna Gore, daughter of then Senator Al Gore, in 1985.
Amy Carter, daughter of former President Jimmy Carter.
Actors Mary-Kate and Ashley Olsen attended during production of The Adventures of Mary-Kate & Ashley.
Jacob Roloff, of the reality television series Little People, Big World, in 2009
Actor Austin O'Brien in 1997.

Guests 
The cast and crew of Apollo 13 visited Space Camp during pre-production. Tom Hanks, who portrayed James Lovell in the film, would return in 2006, as his son was attending at the time. Hanks also ate breakfast with some German rocket scientists.

In popular culture

Books
Unleashed in Space (1999), The Super Adventures of Wishbone, Book 3.

Films 
SpaceCamp (1986) portrays youngsters on a fictional adventure at the camp.
Beyond the Stars (1989), a drama about a teenager (Christian Slater) who befriends a gruff former astronaut (Martin Sheen).
The Case of the U.S. Space Camp Mission (1996), a direct-to-video film starring the Olsen twins.
Stranger Than Fiction (2006), the protagonist's friend (Tony Hale) says the camp would be at the top of his bucket list and that "You're never too old to go to Space Camp, dude," and later inspects a brochure about programs for adults.
A Smile as Big as the Moon (2012), a television movie based on a teacher's memoirs.
Space Warriors (2013), a television movie about Space Camp trainees who help rescue three astronauts stranded in orbit.

Television 

Chuck, season 2, episode 9, "Chuck Versus the Sensei", John Casey sarcastically refers to Space Camp as being where all the cool kids go.
Designing Women, season 6, episode 2, "The Big Desk, Part 2", Julia Duffy's character, Allison Sugarbaker, confesses her ex-boyfriend, Randy, was infatuated with Space Camp "and, when he got too old to go, he sued them."
Dexter's Laboratory, season 2, episode 12c, "Ol' McDexter", Dee Dee attended a camp similar to space camp while Dexter attended an Amish farm camp.
Eastbound & Down, season 4, episode 3.
Eureka, season 4, episode 18, "This One Time at Space Camp...", candidates for a space mission tell a selection panel of their pasts.
Family Guy, season 11, episode 9, "Space Cadet", Chris Griffin attends Space Camp.
Fetch! with Ruff Ruffman, season 1, episode 19, "Ruff Ruffman Spaces Out", features the show's contestants, the FETCHers, sent to Space Camp to take part in astronaut training.
The Goldbergs, season 3, episode 22, "Smother's Day",  Adam dreams of going to Space Camp.
Grounded for Life, season 4, episode 28, "Space Camp Oddity", Brad tells Lily about his space-camp girlfriend, Lana.
Late Night with Conan O'Brien (2010), the host sent his sidekick, Andy Richter, to Adult Space Camp.
Nickelodeon game shows often had trips to Space Camp as prizes, including Double Dare, Finders Keepers, Get the Picture, Legends of the Hidden Temple, Nick Arcade, and Think Fast. 
The Simpsons, season 14, episode 12, "I'm Spelling as Fast as I Can", Nelson Muntz says he was at Space Camp during his summer holidays where Martin Prince was his commander. 
Southern Fried Road Trip, season 1, episode 2, "Space Camp, the Final Food Frontier", features Adult Space Camp.

References

External links 
 
Space Camp for Interested Visually Impaired Students (SCI-VIS)
Youth U.S. Space Camp for Hong Kong students to U.S. Space and Rocket Center in August each year

Summer camps in Alabama
United States
U.S. Space & Rocket Center
1982 establishments in Alabama
Wernher von Braun
NASA programs